Blake Thomson (born 9 December 1997) is an Australian cricketer. He made his List A debut for Victoria in the 2017–18 JLT One-Day Cup on 10 October 2017.

References

External links
 

1997 births
Living people
Australian cricketers
Place of birth missing (living people)
Victoria cricketers